The Liberia worm lizard (Cynisca liberiensis) is a worm lizard species in the family Amphisbaenidae. It is found in Liberia, Sierra Leone, and Guinea.

References

Cynisca (lizard)
Reptiles described in 1878
Taxa named by George Albert Boulenger